

Black Prairie is a six-piece string band from Portland, Oregon. The band formed in early 2007.  Their first album, Feast of the Hunter's Moon, was released on April 6, 2010, on the Sugar Hill label.

History
The band began when The Decemberists' Chris Funk (dobro) and Nate Query (bass) had some time off from touring and decided to put together a side project.  Other members of the band include The Decemberists' accordion player Jenny Conlee and drummer John Moen, singer and violinist Annalisa Tornfelt of Bearfoot and The Woolwines, and guitarist Jon Neufeld of Dolorean and Jackstraw.

The band performed at the South by Southwest festival in March 2010, Oregon's Pickathon Festival in August 2010, and toured in October 2010.

Influences
Their musical influences include bluegrass, klezmer, jazz, tango, and Romanian music resulting in a unique sound. Chris Funk says Black Prairie's sound "bridges the music of Clarence White and Ennio Morricone".

Discography

Albums

Music videos

References

External links

 Black Prairie official website

Americana music groups
Musical groups from Portland, Oregon
2007 establishments in Oregon
Musical groups established in 2007